Ryazhenka or ryazhanka (Russian: ряженка; Belarusian: ражанка) is a traditional fermented milk product in Belarus, Ukraine and Russia. It is made from baked milk by lactic acid fermentation.

Origin and etymology 
Russian and Soviet sources call it Little-Russian ryazhenka, Ukrainian ryazhenka or Ukrainian soured milk and attribute its origin to Ukrainian cuisine.

While some dictionaries define both names as synonyms, the industry standard GOST distinguishes between the two products, specifying somewhat different production processes.

Before fermentation, milk should be heated to a high temperature.

Production 
Ryazhenka is made by first pasteurizing milk before simmering it on low heat for eight hours at minimum. Historically, this was done by placing a clay pot (glechik or krinka) with milk in the traditional Ukrainian oven for a day until it is coated with a brown crust. Prolonged exposure to heat causes the Maillard reaction between the milk's amino acids and sugars, resulting in the formation of melanoidin compounds that give it a creamy color and caramel flavor. A great deal of moisture evaporates, resulting in a change of consistency. In household production, sour cream (smetana) is subsequently added to trigger fermentation. In modern industrial production, pure thermophile bacterial cultures (Streptococcus thermophilus and Lactobacillus delbrueckii subsp. bulgaricus) are used instead. The mixture is then kept in a warm place. The fermentation occurs at temperatures above ca. 40 °C / 100 °F and usually takes from three to six hours.

The fat content of industrially produced ryazhenka is typically 3.5–4%, but in general it is allowed to vary from <0.5% (if made from skimmed milk) up to 8.9%. The protein content is at least 3%. The carbohydrate content is usually 4–5%. Like scalded milk, ryazhenka is free of harmful bacteria and enzymes and can be stored safely at room temperature for up to forty hours.

See also
 Varenets
 Qatiq
 Kaymak
 Dulce de leche
 List of yogurt-based dishes and beverages

References

Fermented dairy products
Yogurt-based drinks
Sour foods
Russian drinks
Ukrainian drinks
Belarusian cuisine
Russian dairy products